The caroticotympanic arteries (tympanic branch) are small branches of the internal carotid artery; they enter the tympanic cavity through a minute foramen in the carotid canal, and anastomose with the anterior tympanic branch of the internal maxillary, and with the posterior tympanic branch of the stylomastoid artery.

See also
 caroticotympanic nerves

External links

Arteries of the head and neck